Chioninia nicolauensis (English: São Nicolau skink) is a species of skinks in the family Scincidae. It is endemic to the Cape Verde island of São Nicolau. Until around 2010, it was treated as a subspecies of Chioninia fogoensis.

References

Further reading
Schleich, Herpetofauna caboverdiana (Cape Verdean Herpetofauna). Spixiana Supplement (1987), vol. 12, p. 1-75

nicolauensis
Endemic vertebrates of Cape Verde
Fauna of Fogo, Cape Verde
Fauna of São Nicolau, Cape Verde
Reptiles described in 1987
Taxa named by Hans Hermann Schleich